Mantispinae is a subfamily of mantidflies in the family Mantispidae. There are at least 30 genera and 310 described species in Mantispinae.

Genera
These 33 genera belong to the subfamily Mantispinae:

 Afromantispa Snyman and Ohl in Snyman et al., 2012 i c g
 Asperala Lambkin, 1986 i c g
 Austroclimaciella Handschin, 1961 i c g
 Austromantispa Esben-Petersen, 1917 i c g
 Buyda Navás, 1926 i c g
 Campanacella Handschin, 1961 i c g
 Campion Navás, 1914 i c g
 Cercomantispa Handschin, 1959 i c g
 Climaciella Enderlein, 1910 i c g b
 Dicromantispa Hoffman in Penny, 2002 i c g b
 Entanoneura Enderlein, 1910 i c g
 Euclimacia Enderlein, 1910 i g
 Eumantispa Okamoto, 1910 i c g
 Haematomantispa Hoffman in Penny, 2002 i c g
 Leptomantispa Hoffman in Penny, 2002 i c g b
 Madantispa Fraser, 1952 i c g
 Mantispa Illiger in Kugelann, 1798 i c g
 Mimetispa Handschin, 1961 i c g
 Nampista Navás, 1914 i c g
 Necyla Navás, 1913 i c g
 Orientispa Poivre, 1984 i c g
 Paramantispa Williner and Kormilev, 1959 i c g
 Paulianella Handschin, 1960 i c g
 Pseudoclimaciella Handschin, 1960 i c g
 Rectinerva Handschin, 1959 i c g
 Sagittalata Handschin, 1959 i c g
 Spaminta Lambkin, 1986 i c g
 Stenomantispa Stitz, 1913 i c g
 Toolida Lambkin, 1986 i c g
 Tuberonotha Handschin, 1961 i c g
 Xaviera Lambkin, 1986 i c g
 Xeromantispa Hoffman in Penny, 2002 i c g b
 Zeugomantispa Hoffman in Penny, 2002 i c g b

Data sources: i = ITIS, c = Catalogue of Life, g = GBIF, b = Bugguide.net

References

Further reading

External links

 

Hemerobiiformia
Articles created by Qbugbot